Kenneth Francis Rowley (29 August 1926 – 1995) was an English footballer who played as an inside forward. He made 44 appearances in the Football League playing for Wolverhampton Wanderers, Birmingham City and Coventry City.

Playing career
Rowley was born in Pelsall, which was then in Staffordshire, in 1926. He turned professional with Wolverhampton Wanderers in 1947, but in five years played only one league match for them. He joined Birmingham City in January 1951. He had an excellent strike rate for the club, scoring 12 goals in 28 games in the Second Division, before suffering an injury so severe that medical opinion was that he would never play again. He made a comeback a year later, in December 1953, and scored a further 7 goals in 12 games before moving on to Coventry City in November 1954. At the end of the 1954–55 season injury forced his retirement at the age of 28. Two years later he attempted a comeback in non-league football with Bromsgrove Rovers. He died in 1995.

References

External links

1926 births
1995 deaths
People from Pelsall
English footballers
Association football forwards
Wolverhampton Wanderers F.C. players
Birmingham City F.C. players
Coventry City F.C. players
Bromsgrove Rovers F.C. players
English Football League players